Pencycuron is a phenylurea fungicide developed by Bayer Crop Science and marketed under the brand name Monceren. It has specific activity against the plant pathogen Rhizoctonia solani for which it was developed.

References

External links 
 

Fungicides
Ureas
Cyclopentyl compounds